Donald Lawson Turcotte (born 22 April 1932) is an American geophysicist most noted for his work on the boundary layer theory of mantle convection as part of the theory of plate tectonics. He works at the University of California, Davis.

Education and career
Turcotte trained as an engineer, graduating with a PhD in aeronautics and physics from Caltech in 1958. After a year at the Naval Postgraduate School in Monterey, Turcotte took up a position at Cornell University, in the graduate school of Aeronautical Engineering. In 1965, Turcotte took a sabbatical at the University of Oxford, in the engineering department. Here he met Ron Oxburgh, who had recently arrived in the Department of Geology, and they began a collaboration in which they developed ideas about convective flow in the Earth's mantle, and its links to the newly emerging ideas of plate tectonics. In 1973, Turcotte moved to the geology department at Cornell where he worked for the next thirty years. After retiring from Cornell in 2003, Turcotte moved to University of California, Davis.

He has won awards including the Arthur L. Day Medal of the Geological Society of America, the William Bowie Medal and the Charles A. Whitten Medal of the American Geophysical Union. He is a member of the National Academy of Sciences.

In 2008, the American Geophysical Union's Nonlinear Geophysics committee established the Donald L. Turcotte Award, which is given annually to one honoree "in recognition of outstanding dissertation research that contributes directly to nonlinear geophysics."

Books 
 Donald L. Turcotte and Gerald Schubert, Geodynamics, Cambridge University Press, Third Edition (2014),  (Hardback)  (Paperback)
 Donald L. Turcotte, Fractals and chaos in geology and geophysics, Cambridge University Press, 1997
 Gerald Schubert, Donald L. Turcotte, and Peter Olson, Mantle convection in the Earth and planets, Cambridge University Press, 2001

References

1932 births
Living people
American geophysicists
California Institute of Technology alumni
Cornell University faculty
University of California, Davis faculty
Members of the United States National Academy of Sciences